Ayshia K. M. Pittman (born September 10, 1993) is an Seminole-American politician who currently serves as a member of the Oklahoma House of Representatives from the 99th district as a member of the Democratic Party. She is the third Seminole to serve in the Oklahoma Legislature.

Early life

Ayshia K. M. Pittman was born on September 10, 1993, to Anastasia Pittman, who served in the Oklahoma House of Representatives from the 99th district and in the Oklahoma Senate. Pittman is a member of the Seminole Nation of Oklahoma, and is the great-great-granddaughter of Abner Burnett, who survived the Tulsa race massacre. Pittman attended the University of Oklahoma and graduated from the Oklahoma Policy Institute.

Oklahoma House of Representatives

Elections

Pittman won the initial Democratic primary in 2018, against Nkem House, Crentha Sequoya Turner, and Steve Davis for a seat in the Oklahoma House of Representatives from the 99th district and defeated House in the runoff primary. She succeeded Representative George E. Young, who had run for a seat in the Oklahoma Senate. She was the third Seminole to serve in the Oklahoma Legislature.

In 2020, Pittman ran for reelection and in the Democratic primary she was challenged by Susan Porter, the daughter of E. Melvin Porter who was the first black member of the Oklahoma Senate. Pittman defeated Porter in the Democratic primary.

Tenure

In 2020, Pittman was appointed to the Joint Legislative Committee on State and Tribal Relations by Speaker of the House Charles McCall. She is a member of the Oklahoma Legislature Black Caucus.

During the 2020 presidential election Pittman endorsed Joe Biden for the Democratic presidential nomination.

Political positions

In 2020, Pittman was endorsed by EMILY's List.

In 2021, legislation which would prohibit governmental entities from mandating vaccination and from inflicting penalties against any person who refuses to vaccinate, including children, was passed through the public health committee by a vote of seven to one, with Pittman being the only vote against. The legislation later passed in the state house by a vote of seventy-one to twenty-five.

Electoral history

References

External links
 
 Ajay Pittman's campaign website

1993 births
21st-century African-American politicians
21st-century African-American women
21st-century American politicians
21st-century American women politicians
21st-century Native American politicians
21st-century Native American women
African-American state legislators in Oklahoma
Black Seminole people
Living people
Democratic Party members of the Oklahoma House of Representatives
Native American women in politics
Seminole Nation of Oklahoma state legislators in Oklahoma
Women state legislators in Oklahoma